The Church of Hosios David is a late 5th-century church in Thessaloniki, Greece. During the Byzantine times, it functioned as the katholikon of the Latomos Monastery, and was adorned with rich mosaic and fresco decoration, which was renewed in the 12th–14th centuries. Today, the surviving examples are of high artistic quality, especially the apse mosaic Icon of Christ of Latomos. Under Ottoman rule, the building was converted into a mosque (probably in the 16th century), until it was reconsecrated as a Greek Orthodox church in 1921, thus receiving its present name. In 1988, this monument was included among the Paleochristian and Byzantine monuments of Thessaloniki on the list of World Heritage Sites by UNESCO.

Architecture 
The original architecture of the Church of Hosios David was constructed in a cross-in-square plan with squares as the main shape of the floor plan. This pattern would later become more popular. The structure contained square bays in the corners. The bays all connected to the main cross room via hallways. The bays also connected to the outside.

Sometime during the middle Byzantine period the structure was damaged by earthquakes. Parts of the structure collapsed including the tribelon. The middle Byzantine period also saw the addition of marbling and a second round of fresco paintings.

Decoration 
The marble decoration in the Church of Hosios David depicted crosses, vines and leaves in swirling detailing.

The mosaic Icon of Christ of Latomos of the Theophany is a detailed mosaic in a naturalistic style depicting Christ holding a text saying in Greek, “Behold our God, in whom we hope and we rejoice in our salvation, that he may grand rest to this home.” The mosaic contains symbolism indicating the Evangelists. The mosaic representing the Theophany is complex, with a detailed border, and a lot of elements within the scene. The focus of the image is Christ as shown by his gaze, his position in the center and the halos surrounding Christ’s head and body. This icon was said to have been miraculously created in the 3rd century.

Byzantine murals were discovered under the plaster at the Church of Hosios David. These murals are what is left of extensive fresco paintings from the middle Byzantine period, approximately 1160-70. The east part of the south and north barrel-vaults contains depictions of the nativity, the presentation in the temple, our lady of the passion, Christ on the mount of olives, entry into Jerusalem, theophany, and decorative panels meant to resemble marble slabs. The south barrel has the rest of the nativity and presentation in the temple. This area also depicts images of the baptism and transfiguration. The Church of Hosios David contains few borders between the different fresco scenes, which is an uncommon feature for this time.

Most of the frescos were created during the middle Byzantine period. The frescos: our lady of the passion, the entry into Jerusalem, and Christ on the Mount of Olives are likely later, during the Palaeologan period, approximately c. 1300. Many of the frescos today are damaged because of effects of time such as: earthquakes, cracking, water damage, and the plaster applied to cover them in the Turkish era.

After the Byzantine Era 
The Church of Hosios David has a simple exterior and is more removed from the heart of Thessaloniki, closer to the mountains. This contributed to the theory that the Church of Hosios David was not converted to a mosque immediately after the Turks conquered the area, as the Turks converted all the best churches, and best locations first. The mosque was called Suluca or Murad Mosque. When the Church of Hosios David was converted to a mosque the walls and by extension the art was covered with plaster. In addition the Turkish period added a minaret at the south-west corner bay. Only the base remains today, together with the spiral staircase with in the remaining part of the minaret.

References

Sources
 Entwistle, Chris, and Liz James, eds. New Lights on Old Glass: Recent Research on Byzantine Mosaics and Glass. London: British Museum, 2013.
 
 Nicol. 1964. Review of Early Byzantine Churches in Macedonia and Southern Serbia: A Study of the Origins and the Initial Development of East Christian Art. The Journal of Hellenic Studies 84. The Society for the Promotion of Hellenic Studies: 233–34.
 Pentcheva, Bissera V.. 2000. “Imagined Images: Visions of Salvation and Intercession in a Double-sided Icon from Poganovo”. Dumbarton Oaks Papers 54. Dumbarton Oaks, Trustees for Harvard University: 139–53.
Rice, D. Talbot. 1961. Review of Greece-byzantine Mosaics. The Burlington Magazine 103 (701). The Burlington Magazine Publications Ltd.: 367–67. 
Spieser. 1998. “The Representation of Christ in the Apses of Early Christian Churches”. Gesta 37 (1). [University of Chicago Press, International Center of Medieval Art]: 63–73.
Tsigaridas, Euth N. Latomou Monastery: (the Church of Hosios David). Thessaloniki: Institute for Balkan Studies, 1988.

Byzantine church buildings in Thessaloniki
World Heritage Sites in Greece
Mosques converted from churches in Ottoman Greece
5th-century churches in Greece
Former mosques in Greece